Junior varsity (often called "JV") players are the members of a team who are not the main players in a competition (such as any football, basketball, or baseball game), usually at the high school level–– and formerly at the collegiate level–– in the United States. The main players comprise the varsity team. Although the intensity of the JV team may vary from place to place, most junior varsity teams consist of players who are in their freshman and sophomore years in school, though occasionally upperclassmen may play on JV teams. For this reason, junior varsity teams are also often called freshman/sophomore teams. Especially skilled or physically mature freshmen and sophomores may compete at the varsity level. Some private school associations may permit very skilled seventh- or eighth-graders to compete on varsity teams. At larger schools, there may be two junior varsity teams for some sports, with a lower-level team typically consisting only of freshmen.

Junior varsity players
Members of a junior varsity team are underclassmen determined by the coaching staff to have less experience or ability than those on the varsity roster. As such, junior varsity teams are used to prepare these athletes to compete at the varsity level. In other schools, the line between JV and varsity is arbitrary, with all players at a certain grade level (usually seniors and, in smaller schools, juniors) at the varsity and all others below that grade level at JV, with only a few exceptions for highly talented (or well-connected) student-athletes, or much smaller schools where - due to their low enrollment - are limited in the number of upperclassmen athletes.

Some teams require participation on a junior varsity team before being eligible to try out for a varsity team. These players can provide the varsity team with extra depth, with their service as back-up players. The NCAA previously prohibited true freshmen from playing varsity college football and basketball; as a result, numerous junior-varsity "freshmen teams" appeared on many major college campuses. The NCAA repealed this limitation in 1972; to the extent that junior varsity teams exist at the college level, many are classified as club squads.

Many sports teams have assistant coaches responsible for developing the talent of junior varsity players.

When they play
A coach may call on one or more junior varsity players during a varsity game, especially when a varsity player is injured, is not performing well, or (because of a violation or poor grades) is disqualified from further competition. If a junior varsity player does well, they will see more playing time in the future or may even get moved up to the varsity level.

A team will have many talented players, but the coach is unable to come up with a rotation that allows everyone to play. The decision of when to play junior varsity players in a one-sided game is often at the coach's discretion. This depends on the coach's strategy, the time remaining in the game, the point margin, and the game situation. The coach of a losing team—especially if the players are not very good or they are inexperienced players—sometimes may continue to play the main players against the winning team's junior varsity players to give the team experience.

When the winning team is ahead by a substantial margin late in the game, the coaches of both the winning and losing teams may "empty their benches"—that is, they remove the varsity players and play the junior varsity players for the remainder of the game. The junior varsity players can impress coaches during this "garbage time" in hopes of gaining more playing time in subsequent games, while at the same time reducing the risk of serious injury by varsity players by resting them in a game whose outcome has been effectively decided.

Which sports
Some games have rules which allow unlimited use of junior varsity players, such as basketball. Other sports have different ways of determining junior varsity participants. For instance, in high school wrestling, there can only be one wrestler competing for a team at a particular weight class in a given varsity match. The team's representative is often determined by a "challenge match," in which the top two wrestlers at that weight compete for the right to participate in the varsity match. The loser wrestles that night's junior varsity match.

A similar format is used for golf, tennis, and badminton, with players who lose to varsity opponents participating in the junior varsity part of the meet.

Junior varsity games
Junior varsity games are specially-scheduled events in which junior varsity players play to gain skills and experience. These games may be played immediately before a varsity contest; or if a school has a sophomore or freshman team, the junior varsity game will take place on another night or, in some cases, an off-peak time slot such as Saturday morning. Records and statistics are kept for the junior varsity team, and some leagues offer a junior varsity championship. An assistant coach acts as the head coach for these games.

In states that use ratings systems to determine playoff participation, junior varsity games do not factor in, and are played with considerably less hoopla than varsity games. Attendance is far less, and bands, cheerleaders, and media coverage are usually not present.

In some sports, such as tennis and golf, a junior varsity meet will take place simultaneously with the varsity event; however, the scores are separately tabulated. In track and field, a junior varsity "heat" of a particular event may take place either before or after the varsity "heat" (again, implementing separate tabulation of meet results).

An underclassman who plays on a junior varsity team one year is expected to gain enough experience to be one of the varsity players the next season. A team's head coach will attend a junior varsity games to evaluate skill and decide if a player is ready to play in the main part of a varsity game.

Junior varsity teams may or may not travel with or take the field/court with the varsity team, or in particularly well-organized hierarchies (especially in sports such as football) may alternate home and away schedules with the varsity squad to ensure at least one of the two teams plays at home each week. This is often dependent on the size of the varsity team, availability of transportation and policies invoked by either the coach, school or league. A JV can sometimes completely replace a varsity team in a game with little to no importance; the Missouri Turkey Day Game, for example, has a provision that if either of the two regular opponents is still in the midst of their playoff tournament by the time the game is held, the JV teams will instead play the game.

See also
Rookie

References

Terminology used in multiple sports
Student sport